Papilio ascalaphus, the Ascalaphus swallowtail, is a butterfly of the family Papilionidae. It is found in Indonesia and the Philippines.

The wingspan is 140–160 mm.

The larvae feed on Citrus species.

Subspecies
Papilio ascalaphus ascalaphus (Sulawesi)
Papilio ascalaphus munascalaphus (Muna Island)
Papilio ascalaphus ascalon (Sula Island)

External links
Butterflycorner.net

ascalaphus
Butterflies described in 1836